Joey "Jett" Hornish (born June 19, 1998) is a professional skateboarder. He was born in Baltimore, Maryland. Mike Vallely named Jett professional in 2017. Jett also started Jett brand clothing in 2019.

Career
When Jett was 6 years old his mother went to a yard sale and bought her son his first skateboard. Jett skated in national competitions and was invited to skate at the AST Dew Tour in 2006 - 2009. At the age of 7 Jett was on the Dew Sports Tour (Extreme Sports Circuit). Jett was the youngest skateboarder (seven years old) to successfully land a 540 ( 1 ½ rotations in midair) in a skate competition. He was sponsored by Conformist, a Baltimore skateboarding company., Underground Wheels, and Osiris shoes.

When Jett was seven years old he was named event MVP of a Philadelphia event by Mike Vallely. Jett was named top ten athlete in Maryland with Michael Phelps and Carmelo Anthony in 2009.  Jett stopped skating for almost five years between 2010–2015 and then returned as a streetskater.  His return video was called "The Comeback" and can be found on YouTube.

In 2017, at Charm City Skate Park, Mike Vallely presented Jett with his first pro model skateboard by Street Plant Boards. Jett's pro video, The Dream, which Jett also edited and directed, has over 800,000 views. It includes Mike Vallely skating with Mark Gonzales at Brooklyn Banks.

In January and October 2018, Jett helped raise money for Jake's Skatepark which will be located in Baltimore's Inner Harbor. The park was named for Jake Owen, a five-year-old skater who was killed by a driver distracted while using a cell phone.  Jett has also helped raise money for Sharped Dress Man, a program to help empower men in Baltimore and California.  Jett also successfully started JETT brand clothing line in 2019.  He was the first skateboarder selected to be in the national anti-animal abuse program, Show Your Soft Side campaign. 

In January 2020, Jett was part of the groundbreaking ceremonies for Baltimore's Rash Field in the Inner Harbor.  He received a Mayoral proclamation for his fundraising efforts for the park and his advocacy for skateboarding. Jett's latest film, The Reality showcased some of the best skaters in Baltimore and filmed the reality of Baltimore City street skating as well as exhibiting the clothing  In November 2021, Jake's skatepark was completed and Jett successfully aired over the Mayor of Baltimore in the opening ceremonies. 

In July 2021, Jett teamed up with pro skater and former addict Brandon Novak to help others fight addictions.  While in Barcelona, Spain the two Baltimore skaters filmed a video part called The Awakening to help other skaters realize there are roads to recovery. Monies from a Jett fashion drop was donated to the Novak Recovery House  

In May 2022, Jett Brand participated in the Future of Fashion show at the Smithsonian Institute in Washington, DC.  This highly successful fashion show was shown on HBO and featured 10 international designers with Jett being the youngest designer.  Also in May 2022, Jett  established "Breakfast & Boards" for the children of Baltimore City to have skate lessons at Jake's skatepark each month after visiting a Boys & Girls Club in Baltimore. This popular event is continuing in 2023.

Personal life 
Jett graduated from Patuxent High School in 2016.

References

External links

1998 births
Living people
American skateboarders
People from Towson, Maryland
Sportspeople from Baltimore